Jeffrey David Fahey (born November 29, 1952) is an American actor. He has portrayed Captain Frank Lapidus on the ABC series Lost and the title role of Deputy Marshal Winston MacBride on The Marshal.

Early life and education
Fahey was born in Olean, New York, the sixth of 13 siblings in an Irish American family. His mother, Jane, was a homemaker, and his father, Frank Fahey, worked at a clothing store. Fahey was raised in Buffalo, New York, from the age of ten and attended Father Baker's high school there. Fahey left home at the age of 17, subsequently hitchhiking to Alaska. He later backpacked through Europe, and worked on an Israeli kibbutz.

Career
Fahey started performing when he won a full scholarship to dance at the Joffrey Ballet School at the age of 25. He performed in theaters across the United States and on Broadway. He landed his first major role on television playing Gary Corelli on the soap opera, One Life to Live.

In 1985, he received his first major film role as Tyree in Silverado. In 1986, he co-starred with Anthony Perkins in Psycho III as Duane Duke, a money-desperate guitarist who is hired by Norman Bates to work at the Bates Motel. That same year, Fahey guest starred on the Season 3 premiere of Miami Vice as gun dealer Eddie Kaye, famously destroying Detective Sonny Crockett's Ferrari Daytona.

In 1990, Fahey starred alongside Marisa Tomei in the TV movie Parker Kane, and alongside Clint Eastwood in the Eastwood-directed White Hunter Black Heart. In 1992, he starred alongside Pierce Brosnan in The Lawnmower Man. In 1995, Fahey was the lead in the Trimark Pictures adventure film Eye of the Wolf, directed by Arnaud Sélignac, based on the book "KAZAN" by James Oliver Curwood.

In 1995, he starred as "Winston McBride" on ABC's The Marshal.  In 1999, he played the main character in Apocalypse II: Revelation. In 2007, he appeared in the Robert Rodriguez film Planet Terror and starred in Messages with Bruce Payne.

Fahey appeared as daredevil Dutch the Clutch in an episode of Psych at the beginning of the third season of the show.

Fahey played Frank Lapidus, the airplane and helicopter pilot of the research team sent to the island in Lost, as a recurring character in the fourth and fifth seasons, and as a regular character in the sixth season.

In 2010, he had a major role in the Robert Rodriguez's action film Machete.

In 2013, a new production of the classic play Twelve Angry Men took place at the Garrick Theatre in London, running until March 2014. Fahey played the part of the last juror in the story to change his vote to not guilty. Other notable actors appearing in this production were Martin Shaw who played the part of juror number 8 (a role made famous in the 1957 film by Henry Fonda), Robert Vaughn and Nick Moran.

In 2015, Jeff Fahey starred in History Channel's mini-series Texas Rising as Tom Rusk, the Secretary of War for the new Republic of Texas who fought alongside General Sam Houston.

In 2017, Jeff Fahey joined the UK tour of Bill Kenwright's production of Gore Vidal's The Best Man where he plays the part of US Presidential hopeful Joseph Cantwell against political rival William Russell, played by Martin Shaw.

Humanitarian efforts
In 2006 and 2007, Fahey spent time in Afghanistan assisting the newly established American University of Afghanistan, and launching a project to assist orphans in Kabul.

Fahey's recent humanitarian work has revolved around the U.S. Committee for Refugees and Immigrants, in which he has been focusing on the subject of warehousing, a practice in which the rights and mobility of refugees is restricted by a host country. Fahey's work specifically has addressed the subject of warehoused Sahrawi refugees in Algeria.

Filmography

Film 
 Silverado (1985) as Tyree
 Psycho III (1986) as Duane Duke
 Riot on 42nd St. (1987) as Frank Tackler
 Backfire (1988) as Donnie McAndrew
 Split Decisions (1988) as Ray McGuinn
 True Blood (1989) as Raymond Trueblood
 Minnamurra (a.k.a. Outback) (1989) as Ben Creed
 The Serpent of Death (1989) as Jake Bonner
 The Last of the Finest (a.k.a. Blue Heat) (1990) as Ricky Rodriguez
 Impulse (1990) as Stan
 White Hunter Black Heart (1990) as Pete Verrill
 Body Parts (1991) as Bill Chrushank
 Iron Maze (1991) as Barry Mikowski
 The Lawnmower Man (1992) as Jobe Smith
 Sketch Artist (1992)
 The Hit List (1993) as Charlie Pike
 Quick (1993) as Muncie
 Woman of Desire (1994) as Jack
 Freefall (1994) as Dex Dellum
 Wyatt Earp (1994) as Ike Clanton
 Temptation (1994) as Eddie Lanarsky
 Serpent's Lair (1995) as Tom Bennett
 Darkman III: Die Darkman Die (1996) as Peter Rooker
 Lethal Tender (1996) as Det. David Chase
 Small Time (1996) as The Dutchman
 The Sweeper (Video, 1996) as Dale Goddard
 Catherine's Grove (1997) as Jack Doyle
 The Underground (1997) as Brian Donnegan
 Time Under Fire (1997) as Alan / John Deakins
 Extramarital (1998) as Griffin
 Detour (Video, 1998) as Danny Devlin
 The Last Siege: Never Surrender (a.k.a. Hijack) (1999) as Eddie Lyman
 When Justice Fails (1999) as Tom Chaney
 Apocalypse II: Revelation (a.k.a. Revelation: The Book Has Been Opened) (1999) as Thorold Stone
 No Tomorrow (1999) as Davis
 Dazzle (1999) as The Collector
 The Contract (1999) as Detective Tucci
 Epicenter (2000) as FBI Agent Moore
 The Sculptress (2000) as Matthew Dobie
 The Newcomers (2000) as Mack Weatherton
 Spin Cycle (2000) as Tall Vinnie
 Blind Heat (2001) as Paul Burke
 Out There (2001, Short) as Agent Gary Booth
 Cold Heart (2001) as Dr. Phil Davis
 Maniacts (2001) as Joe Spinelli
 Outlaw (2001) as Jim Moran
 Choosing Matthias (2001) as Charlie
 Inferno (a.k.a. California Firestorm) (2002) as Robert 'Jake' Wheeler
 Unspeakable (2002) as Governor
 Fallen Angels (2002) as Prof. Richard Leighton
 Ghost Rock (2004) as Moses Logan
 No Witness (2004) as Senator Gene Haskell
 Close Call (2004) as Elliot Krasner
 Darkhunters (2004) as Mr. Barlow
 Blue Demon (2004) as General Remora
 Day of Redemption (2004) as Frank Everly
 Corpses (Video, 2004) as Captain Winston
 Killing Cupid (a.k.a. Warrior or Assassin) (2005) as The Trainer
 Split Second (2005) as Mr. Kudis
 Only the Brave (2005) as Lt. William Terry
 Scorpius Gigantus (2006) as Major Nick Reynolds
 The Hunt for Eagle One: Crash Point (Video, 2006) as Colonel Halloran
 Grindhouse (2007) as JT (segment "Planet Terror")
 Diablita (2007) as Bill Rockwell
 Messages (2007) as Dr. Richard Murray
 Planet Terror (2007) as J.T.
 Matchmaker Mary (2008) as Cameron Banks
 Machete (2010) as Booth
 Terror Trap (2010) as Cleveland
 Bed and Breakfast (2010)
 Blacktino (2011) as Cooter
 Marriage Retreat (2011) as Craig Sullivan
 Dadgum, Texas (2011) as Robert E Lee Magee
 Eldorado (2012) as Doc Martin
 Easy Rider: The Ride Back (2012) as Wes Coast
 Hatfields and McCoys: Bad Blood (2012) as Devil Anse Hatfield
 Sushi Girl (2012) as Morris
 Guns, Girls and Gambling (2012) as The Cowboy
 100 Below Zero (2013) as Steve Foster
 Beneath (2013) as George Marsh
 The Last Light (2014) as Harold
 Dawn Patrol (2014) as Trick
 Skin Traffik (2015) as Jacob Andries
 Too Late (2015) as Roger
 Confident (Music video, 2015) (Demi Lovato)
 Urge (2016) as Gerald
 The Hollow (2016) as Darryl Everett
 County Line (2017) as Clint Thorne
 American Dresser (2018) as Calhoun
 Alita: Battle Angel (2019) as McTeague
 Santa Fake (2019) as Jim
 Badland (2019) as Huxley Wainwright
 Intrigo: Samaria (2019) as Jacob
 Beckman (2020) as Philip
 A Bird Flew In (2021)
 The Long Night (2022) as Wayne
 Maneater as Professor Hoffman
 Hypnotic (2023) - Post-production
 One Year Off (TBA) - Filming

Television 
 One Life to Live (1984, TV Series) as Gary Corelli
 The Execution of Raymond Graham (1985, TV Movie) as Raymond Graham
 Alfred Hitchcock Presents (1986, TV Series) as Ray Lee
 Miami Vice (1986, TV Series) as Eddie Kaye
 Curiosity Kills (1990, TV Movie) as Matthew Manus
 Parker Kane (1990, TV Movie) as Parker Kane
 Sketch Artist (1992, TV Movie) as Det. Jack Whitfield
 In the Company of Darkness (1993, TV Movie) as Will McCaid
 Blindsided (1993, TV Movie) as Frank McKenna
 Eye of the Wolf (1995, TV Series) as Paul Weyman
 Sketch Artist II: Hands That See (1995, TV Movie) as Jack
 Virtual Seduction (1995, TV Movie) as Liam Bass
 The Marshal (1995, TV Series) as Deputy Marshal Winston MacBride
 Every Woman's Dream (1996, TV Movie) as Mitch Parker
 Operation Delta Force (a.k.a. Great Soldiers) (1997, TV Movie) as Captain Lang
 Perversions of Science (1997, TV Series) as The Bearded Man
 On the Line (1997, TV Movie) as Det. Dan Collins
 Johnny 2.0 (1997, TV Movie) as Johnny Dalton
 The Seventh Scroll (1999, TV Mini-Series) as Nick Harper
 Time Served (1999, TV Movie) as Patrick Berlington
 Nash Bridges (2001, TV Series) as Nelson Collins
 Crossing Jordan (2004, TV Series) as Bounty Hunter
 American Dreams (2004, TV Series) as Stevens
 Icon (2005, TV Movie) as Harvey Blackledge
 Crimson Force (2005, TV Movie) as Older Man
 Locusts: The 8th Plague (2005, TV Movie) as Russ Snow
 Manticore (2005, TV Movie) as Kramer
 Absolute Zero (2006, TV Movie) as Dr. David Kotzman
 The Eden Formula (2006, TV Movie) as Dr. Harrison Parker
 Psych (2008, TV Series) as Dutch the Clutch
 The Cleaner (2008, TV Series) as Quinn
 Criminal Minds (2008, TV Series) as Kane
 Lost (2008–2010, TV Series) as Frank Lapidus
 Cold Case (2009, TV Series) as Darren Malloy '09
 CSI: Miami (2009, TV Series) as Allen Pierce
 Law & Order: LA (2011, TV Series) as Terry Briggs
 Chuck (2011, TV Series) as Karl Sneijder
 Workaholics (2011, TV Series) as Doug
 Alien Tornado (2012, TV Movie) as Judd Walker
 Lake Effects (2012, TV Movie) as Ray
 Femme Fatales (TV Series, 2012; season 2, episodes 13 & 14) as Detective McAllister
 Common Law (2012, TV; season 1, episode 10) as Dan Noone
 Revolution (2012, TV Series) as Ken 'Hutch' Hutchinson
 The Sacred (2012) as George
 Hawaii Five-0 (TV Series, 2013; season 3, episode 12: "Kapu") as Dr. Brian Stevens
 Under the Dome (2013, TV) as Sheriff Howard "Duke" Perkins
 Rewind (2013, TV Movie) as Ellis
 Justified (2015, TV Series) as Zachariah
 Grimm (2015, TV Series) as Elder Bowden
 Scorpion (TV series, 2016; season 2, episode 14: "Son of a Gun") as Kenneth Dodd
 Atomic Shark (2016, TV Movie)
 Legends of Tomorrow (TV series, 2016; season 2, episode 6: "Outlaw Country") as Quentin Turnbull
 Training Day (TV Series, 2017; season 1, episode 5: "Wages of Sin") as Pike
 NCIS: New Orleans (2019) as Sheriff/Mayor
 Wu Assassins (2019) as Jack

References

External links

 
 
 Thespian net

1952 births
Male actors from Buffalo, New York
American male dancers
American male film actors
American people of Irish descent
American male soap opera actors
American male stage actors
American male television actors
Living people
People from Cattaraugus County, New York
20th-century American male actors
21st-century American male actors
Joffrey Ballet School alumni